Scutiger tuberculatus is a species of amphibian in the family Megophryidae. It is endemic to Sichuan, China, where it is only known from Yuexi, Mianning, and Xichang counties. It is found in Luojishan Nature Reserve and Panzhihua-Sutielin Nature Reserve.

Its natural habitats are temperate forests, temperate grassland, rivers, swamps, and freshwater marshes.
It is threatened by habitat loss.

References

tuberculatus
Amphibians of China
Endemic fauna of China
Taxonomy articles created by Polbot
Amphibians described in 1979